The 2007 Arizona State Sun Devils football team represented Arizona State University in the 2007 NCAA Division I FBS football season. The team played its home games at Sun Devil Stadium in Tempe, Arizona.

Schedule

Rankings

Game summaries

San Jose State

Colorado

San Diego State

Oregon State

Stanford

Washington State

Washington

California

Oregon

UCLA

USC

Arizona

Texas

Team

Roster

References

Arizona State
Arizona State Sun Devils football seasons
Pac-12 Conference football champion seasons
Arizona State Sun Devils football